Larry Labruce Koon (February 18, 1944 – October 15, 2021) was an American politician in the state of South Carolina. He served in the South Carolina House of Representatives as a member of the Republican Party from 1975 to 2004, representing Lexington County, South Carolina. In 2004, he was defeated in a Republican primary runoff 55%–45%, and subsequently succeeded in the South Carolina House of Representatives by future governor and United States Ambassador to the United Nations Nikki Haley. At the time of his defeat, he was the longest serving member of the house.

References

1944 births
2021 deaths
Republican Party members of the South Carolina House of Representatives
People from Batesburg-Leesville, South Carolina
People from Lexington, South Carolina